Charles Duncan Trussell (born April 20, 1974) is an American actor and stand-up comic, known for his podcast The Duncan Trussell Family Hour. He appears on the Netflix series The Midnight Gospel, and starred alongside Joe Rogan in the SYFY series Joe Rogan Questions Everything.

Career
Duncan Trussell is a stand-up comedian, podcaster, writer, and actor. He has written and appeared in sketches for two seasons of Fuel TV's Stupidface, Showtime's La La Land, Comedy Central's Nick Swardson's Pretend Time, and both seasons of HBO's Funny or Die Presents.

He regularly tours the country as a stand-up comedian and has performed at Just for Laughs Festival in Montreal and the Moontower Comedy Festival in Austin.

His television credits include MADtv and Curb Your Enthusiasm. He hosted Thunderbrain, a comedy science pilot for Comedy Central. In addition, Trussell has appeared on Cartoon Network’s Adventure Time, four episodes of the Funny or Die web series Drunk History, as well as appearing on Comedy Central’s This is Not Happening. He has also written and served as a consultant for Jason Sudeikis's hosting duties at the 2011 MTV Movie Awards. He co-hosted The Lavender Hour podcast with Natasha Leggero through January 2012.

Trussell hosts his own podcast, The Duncan Trussell Family Hour (DTFH). The DTFH is an ongoing project where Trussell invites eclectic guests to open conversation for about an hour per episode. Beyond his commercial image as an actor and comedian, Trussell is also a burgeoning spiritual teacher in the tradition of Tibetan Buddhism. He frequently invokes applicable uses of Dharma teachings in his podcast, for both daily life and exceptionally difficult or rare circumstances. He denies the label of "Buddhist Comedian," but his podcast's humor frequently draws on high-concept Vajrayana metaphysics, and he commonly references the professional work of spiritual leaders such as Ram Dass and Chögyam Trungpa during conversations with guests. Trussell also hosts a weekly meditation session and discussion of mindfulness practice for fans that subscribe to his work through Patreon.

Among the guests that have been featured are Andrew Yang, Joe Rogan, Ram Dass, Amishi Jha, Dan Harmon, Joey Diaz, Tim Ferriss, Lou Barlow, Bert Kreischer, Alex Grey, Rick Doblin, Natasha Leggero, Graham Hancock, Abby Martin, Dr. Drew, Daniele Bolelli, Christopher Ryan and comedian, podcaster Jessa Reed. As of January 2023, there have been over 500 episodes of the DTFH.

Select episodes of the show were adapted into the Netflix animated series The Midnight Gospel, directed by Pendleton Ward. The show is a high-concept postmodern sci-fi sitcom with Trussell's podcast interviews inspiring story dialogue and animation added afterward. Trussell introduced audiences to his professional meditation teacher, David Nichtern (a former student of Trungpa's) through the show.

Trussell also guest-starred as the character Dave, the moth that experiments with neon for the first time on an episode of the HBO animated show Animals.

Personal life

On December 14, 2012, Trussell announced that he had been diagnosed with testicular cancer. The cancer was successfully treated.

Trussell's mother, Deneen Fendig, died in 2013. Trussell has a brother named Jeff. 

Trussell has dated fellow comedians Mary Lynn Rajskub and Natasha Leggero, as well as model Cora Keegan.

He married his wife, Erin Trussell, in 2018.

On June 27, 2018, Trussell announced on The Joe Rogan Experience podcast that he was going to be a father. He has since had two sons.

References

External links
 
 
 

1974 births
Living people
21st-century American comedians
21st-century American male actors
American Buddhists
American male comedians
American male film actors
American male television actors
American male voice actors
American sketch comedians
American stand-up comedians
Comedians from North Carolina
People from North Carolina